Corophium multisetosum is a small (up to 9mm) European amphipod crustacean of the family Corophiidae.

It builds mud burrows in clay or sand in fresh or weakly brackish habitats.

Corophium multisetosum occurs on coasts of the Netherlands, France, Germany, Poland and the British Isles.

External links
 M.J. de Kluijver & S.S. Ingalsuo Corophium multisetosum Macrobenthos of the North Sea - Crustacea. Marine Species Identification Portal

Corophiidea
Crustaceans described in 1952